The Annex String Quartet, also known as The Annex Quartet, is a string quartet founded in 2008 by violist Yunior Lopez in Toronto, Ontario, Canada. Named after The Annex neighbourhood in downtown Toronto, the quartet began performing regularly in Toronto's bars, coffee shops, and non-classical venues like Aroma Espresso Bar and the St. Lawrence Market. In 2010, they made their American debut alongside the Kronos Quartet at Carnegie Hall, and have since appeared in over 100 performances, recordings, and broadcasts. 

The group's focus has been on bridging the gap between classical and world music. They have performed and recorded in various musical styles, and continue to work with a diverse range of artists including classical pianist Jan Lisiecki, Cuban jazz pianist Hilario Durán, and Canadian jazz icon Jane Bunnett. 

In June 2013, the Annex Quartet released their official debut album, The Roaring Twenties. In 2014, the group was to record a Cuban tour with Cuban Bolero singer Anais Abreu, but the concerts were cancelled. In 2019, the quartet released its second album, Latinoamericana. 

The quartet was the ensemble-in-residence at Toronto's Midtown Music School  and The Stratford Summer Music Festival. As of 2021, Lopez is with The Young Artists Orchestra of Las Vegas, which he founded in 2015. Blackwell is part of the Art of Time Ensemble, Cosbey is a member of the Thunder Bay Symphony Orchestra and Pronin performs and records independently.

Members
Stanislav Pronin violin
Carolyn Blackwell violin
Yunior Lopez viola
Peter Cosbey, cello

Albums
The Roaring Twenties (2013) Modica Music Records
Latinoamericana (2019)

Other Recordings/Film
The Captive - Atom Egoyan (2014)
Maqueque - Jane Bunnett and Maqueque (2014) Justin Time Records
Folktales - Joanna Chapman-Smith, David Stone, and The Annex Quartet (2015)

References

External links
Annex String Quartet

Musical groups established in 2008
Canadian string quartets

ch:附件弦乐四重奏
de:Emerson String Quartet
fr:Quatuor Annex
it:Quartetto Annex
he:נספח רביעיית מיתרים
nl:Annex String Quartet
ja:別館弦楽四重奏団